Burmannia biflora, common name northern bluethread, is a plant species native to Cuba, the Bahamas and to the southeastern United States. It has been reported from Puerto Rico, eastern Texas, Louisiana, southwestern Arkansas (Hempstead County), southern Mississippi, southern Alabama, Florida, Georgia, South Carolina, North Carolina and southeastern Virginia.

Burmannia biflora grows in wet areas (bogs, swamps, ditches, lake shores, etc.) at elevations less than 100 m. It is an annual herb up to 20 cm tall. Flowers are borne in a loose cyme of up to 12 flowers, blue, 3-winged, sometimes white around the edges.

References

Burmanniaceae
Flora of the Caribbean
Flora of the Southeastern United States
Plants described in 1753
Taxa named by Carl Linnaeus
Flora without expected TNC conservation status